Ghorasahan Assembly constituency is an assembly constituency in Purvi Champaran district in the Indian state of Bihar. The railway station is under Sonpur division. It is under Dhaka subdivision and under Dhaka court jurisdiction. It depends on Dhaka town for its requirements.

Overview
It is part of Sheohar Lok Sabha constituency.

As a consequence of the orders of the Delimitation Commission of India, Ghorasahan Assembly constituency ceased to exist in 2010.

Election results
In the October 2005 and February 2005 state assembly elections, Laxmi Narayan Prasad Yadav of RJD won the Ghorasahan assembly seat defeating his nearest rival Pramod Kumar Sinha of JD(U) in October 2005 and Nek Mahammad of LJP in February 2005. Contests in most years were multi cornered but only winners and runners are being mentioned. Laxmi Narayan Prasad Yadav representing JD(U) defeated Lal Babu Prasad of RJD in 2000. Lal Babu Prasad of JD defeated Raj Kumar Prasad of Congress in 1995 and Anil Kumar Singh of BJP in 1990. Pramod Kumar Singh of Congress defeated Lal Babu Prasad of LD in 1985. Rajendra Pratap Singh of Congress defeated Lal Babu Prasad of Congress (U) in 1980 and Mangal Prasad Yadav of Janata Party in 1977.

References 

Former assembly constituencies of Bihar
Politics of East Champaran district